Episcepsis inornata is a moth of the family Erebidae. It was described by Francis Walker in 1856. It lives in Central America (including Guatemala and Costa Rica). It has also been seen in southern Texas.

The wingspan is about 37 mm.

References

  Retrieved April 20, 2018.
Episcepsis inornata at BOLD
Episcepsis inornata at BHL
Episcepsis inornata at EOL

Euchromiina
Moths described in 1856